Chidozie Godsfavour Ugochinyere (born 13 March 2000) known professionally as Fave is a Nigerian singer and songwriter endorsed to emPawa Africa a record label founded by Mr Eazi. She is widely recognized for her singles "baby riddim" and "beautifully". Fave has collaborations with Nigerian rapper Olamide and singer Simi. She won " Rookie of the year" at the headies 2022 and got nominated for "Most promising artist" and "Best Artist in African Reggae, Dancehall” at the All Africa music Awards, she also got a nomination for "best new artiste" at the Soundcity MVP awards festival 2022.

Background and career 

Fave's passion for music started since her childhood, her career took a new dimension when she moved to Lagos, she started professionally in 2019 when she released her first single M.OM.M.S. which stands for "Me or mask my sins". Her social media account was instrumental in bringing her into the spotlight she started gaining traction after her verse on Jinmi Abdul's produced free beat became and internet sensation specifically on Twitter where she got a lot of positive feedback from the public. Fave went on to release her official debut single N.B.U meaning "nobody but U" on the 17th of April 2020, she released her first EP titled "Anywhere but here" on the November 7th 2020. Fave rose to stardom after the release of her most popular singles "beautifully" and "baby riddim".

The single "baby riddim" became the number 1 song in Nigeria on turntable chart making it the second entry by a lead female artiste to reach number 1 in Nigeria on turntable chart, the single was also the number 1 Global Shazam Afrobeats record for 6 weeks consecutively in 2021.

Fave released her debut EP titled ‘Riddim 5’ which dropped on Thursday January 20, 2022.  The EP includes five solo tracks – Obsessed, S.M.K, Kilotufe, Mr. Man, and her most successful hit, Baby Riddim. The EP became the first 2022-released project to go number 1 on Apple Music Top albums chart in Nigeria. Nigerian rapper Olamide featured Fave on two tracks "want" and "pon pon" in his UY Scuti album released in 2021.

Nigerian singer Simi featured Fave on her single titled "loyal" released in 2022.

Discography

Extended plays 

 Anywhere but here (2020)
 Riddim 5 (2022)

Singles 
Baby Riddim (2021)

Scatta Scatta 

Beautifully (2021)

N.B.U (Nobody But U) (2020)

M.O.M.M.S (Me or Mask My Sins) (2019)

DAL (Dead A*s Love) 

Be With You 

Your Dal 

In Love 

No Love 

Business Man 

Not There 

Party 

Drama

As featured artist 
PonPon - Olamide featuring fave (2021) 

Want - Olamide featuring Fave (2021)

Loyal - Simi featuring Fave (2022)

Awards and nominations

References 

Nigerian musicians